The Sarcolaenaceae are a family of flowering plants endemic to Madagascar. The family includes 79 species of mostly evergreen trees and shrubs in ten genera.

Recent DNA studies indicate that the Sarcolaenaceae are a sibling taxon to the family Dipterocarpaceae of Africa, South America, India, Southeast Asia and Malesia.

References

External links
 Images of Sarcolaenaceae in Madagascar (Missouri Botanic Garden)

 
Malvales families
Endemic flora of Madagascar